Limiting pressure velocity is a tribological term relating to the maximum temperature and compression that an assembly with rubbing surfaces can bear without failing. Pressure-limiting valves are a type of pressure control valve. They safeguard the system against excessive system pressure or limit the operation pressure.

Pre-load valves, also called sequence valves are a type of pressure control valve. They generate a largely constant pressure drop between the inlet and outlet on the valve. In the opposite direction the flow can pass freely. In the normal position the valve has minor leakage.

Tribology